Larry Eugene Cox (September 11, 1947 – February 17, 1990) was an American professional baseball catcher and coach. He played all or parts of nine seasons in Major League Baseball (MLB), from 1973 until 1982.

Early life 
Cox, a native of Ottawa, Ohio, was a 1965 graduate of Ottawa-Glandorf High School, located in Ottawa. The following year, he was signed by the Philadelphia Phillies as an amateur free agent.

Playing career 
After spending seven full seasons in minor league baseball in the club's farm system, Cox debuted with the Phils on April 23, 1973, appeared in one game, and was shuttled back to the minor leagues. He split the 1974–75 seasons between Philadelphia and the minors. At the end of the 1975 season, Cox was traded to the Minnesota Twins for Sergio Ferrer. He then spent the entire 1976 campaign back in Triple-A for the Twins, then was purchased by the Seattle Mariners. He was traded along with Willie Horton, Rick Honeycutt, Leon Roberts and Mario Mendoza from the Mariners to the Texas Rangers for Richie Zisk, Jerry Don Gleaton, Rick Auerbach, Ken Clay, Brian Allard and minor-league right-handed pitcher Steve Finch in an 11-player blockbuster deal on December 18, 1980. Finally, Cox made the majors for five full seasons, playing for the Mariners (1977), Chicago Cubs (1978), the Mariners again (in 1979 and 1980) and Texas Rangers (1981). He returned to the Cubs briefly in May 1982 but spent most of that season as a coach in the minors. He played in 382 career major league games in his career with 182 hits in 825 at bats (a .221 batting average). He hit 12 home runs and had 85 RBIs.

Managerial and coaching career 
He remained in the Cub organization as a minor league manager from 1983 to 1987, and became the bullpen coach on Don Zimmer's staff in 1988–89, including the Cubs' 1989 NL East champion team. But 1989 was to be his last in the game.

Cox died during the offseason of a heart attack while playing racquetball in Bellefontaine, Ohio, at the age of 42.

References

External links

Larry Cox at SABR (Baseball BioProject)
Larry Cox at Baseball Almanac
Larry Cox at Baseballbiography.com
Larry Cox at Pura Pelota (Venezuelan Professional Baseball League)

1947 births
1990 deaths
Baseball players from Ohio
Chicago Cubs coaches
Chicago Cubs players
Eugene Emeralds players
Florida Instructional League Phillies players
Hawaii Islanders players
Huron Phillies players
Iowa Cubs managers
Major League Baseball bullpen coaches
Major League Baseball catchers
Midland Cubs players
People from Bluffton, Ohio
Philadelphia Phillies players
Raleigh-Durham Phillies players
Reading Phillies players
Seattle Mariners players
Spartanburg Phillies players
Tacoma Twins players
Texas Rangers players
Tidewater Tides players
Tigres de Aragua players
American expatriate baseball players in Venezuela
Toledo Mud Hens players
People from Ottawa, Ohio